The Clown Murders is a 1976 Canadian horror film directed by Martyn Burke.  It was one of the earliest films in which John Candy appears.  The Executive Producer was Stephen Stohn, who later produced the Degrassi: The Next Generation TV series.

Plot
Four friends hatch a scheme to dress up like clowns on Halloween and kidnap a businessman's wife (Susan Keller) to prevent him from closing a land deal. Though the scheme is intended as a prank, it takes an ugly turn when real violence is used at the kidnapping. As the kidnappers deal with the fallout from their actions, it becomes apparent that an outside party (also in a clown costume) is stalking them.

Cast
 Stephen Young as Charlie
 Susan Keller as Alison
 Lawrence Dane as Philip
 John Candy as Ollie
 Gary Reineke as Rosie
 John Bayliss as Peter
 Al Waxman as Police Sergeant
 William Osler as Harrison
 Philip Craig as Tom

Release
The film was released by Astral Films in its native Canada on September 1976.

Home media
In the United States, the film was released on VHS by Trans World Entertainment and on DVD on July 12, 2007 by Image Entertainment under license from Cinevision International.

Reception

Kurt Dahlke from DVD Talk gave the film 2.5 out of 5 stars, writing, "The Clown Murders is almost worth a rent for Canadian Cinema scholars or rabid fans of '70s sleazo-crime dramas in this incarnation, but it stinks so much as is that it's really hard to go out on that limb." Todd Martin from HorrorNews.net gave the film a negative review, calling it "mind-numbingly boring" and also criticized the film's lack of scares. Terror Trap awarded the film 1/4 stars, stating that the film "doesn't have the requisite firepower - either in terms of its writing, or its ability to generate dramatic tension - to make for a worthwhile watch."

References

External links

Bibliography

1976 films
English-language Canadian films
1970s English-language films
Canadian horror films
Halloween horror films
Horror films about clowns
Films directed by Martyn Burke
1976 horror films
Films with screenplays by Martyn Burke
Films scored by John Mills-Cockell
1976 directorial debut films
1970s Canadian films